Rua Oscar Freire (in English: Oscar Freire Street) is a tree-lined street stretching from Alameda Casa Branca to Avenida Doutor Arnaldo in the Jardins district of São Paulo. It was named after Oscar Freire de Carvalho,  a physician and forensic medicine professor from Bahia, who helped develop the city's first morgue (Instituto Médico Legal).

According to Excellence Mystery Shopping International, Rua Oscar Freire is the 8th most luxurious street in the world and second in the Americas behind 5th Avenue in New York.

Shops located on Rua Oscar Freire and surrounding streets include Louis Vuitton, Armani (Giorgio Armani and Emporio Armani lines), Carmen Steffens, Dior, Montblanc, Cartier, MaxMara, Ermenegildo Zegna, Versace, Diesel, Cavalli, Bulgari, Salvatore Ferragamo, Marc Jacobs, Gant, Lacoste, Timberland, Tommy Hilfiger, Nike, Adidas, Benetton. Top-notch Brazilian fashion is present with the likes of Alexandre Herchcovitch, Cris Barros, Reinaldo Lourenço, Glória Coelho, Animale, Forum, Ellus, NK Store, Sergio K, Havaianas, Carlos Miele, Cavalera, Le Lis Blanc, Canal, Triton, Iódice and Osklen. National high end jewelry stores include Vivara and H Stern.

Sophisticated food shops and restaurants can also be found. Among them are A Figueira Rubaiyat, Fasano, Antiquarius and 'Gero, four of the city's most traditional and expensive restaurants, as well as Ben & Jerry's. There is a Nespresso store, and in 2010 a Valrhona boutique was opened.

In 2006, stores along the street funded a project to remove unsightly electrical poles and install underground fiber-optic lines instead, in an attempt to make the street more appealing to shoppers.

A new Line 4 - Yellow Metro station was constructed in this street and opened in 2017.

References

Streets in São Paulo
Shopping districts and streets in Brazil
Tourist attractions in São Paulo